Hopea gregaria is a species of plant in the family Dipterocarpaceae. It is native to Sulawesi. It is an endangered species threatened by habitat loss.

References

gregaria
Flora of Sulawesi
Taxonomy articles created by Polbot